The Carmen Arvale is the preserved chant of the Arval priests or Fratres Arvales of ancient Rome.

The Arval priests were devoted to the goddess Dia, and offered sacrifices to her to ensure the fertility of ploughed fields (Latin arvum).  There were twelve Arval priests, chosen from patrician families.  During the Roman Empire the Emperor was always an Arval priest.  They retained the office for life, even if disgraced or exiled.  Their most important festival, the Ambarvalia, occurred during the month of May, in a grove dedicated to Dia.

The Carmen Arvale is preserved in an inscription dating from 218 AD, which contains records of the meetings of the Arval Brethren. It is written in an archaic form of Old Latin, likely not fully understood any more at the time the inscription was made.

One of its interpretations goes as follows:

enos Lases iuuate
enos Lases iuuate
enos Lases iuuate

neue lue rue Marmar sins incurrere in pleores
neue lue rue Marmar sins incurrere in pleores
neue lue rue Marmar sins incurrere in pleores

satur fu, fere Mars, limen sali, sta berber
satur fu, fere Mars, limen sali, sta berber
satur fu, fere Mars, limen sali, sta berber

semunis alternei advocapit conctos
semunis alternei advocapit conctos
semunis alternei advocapit conctos

enos Marmor iuuato
enos Marmor iuuato
enos Marmor iuuato

triumpe triumpe triumpe triumpe triumpe

While passages of this text are obscure, the traditional interpretation makes the chant a prayer to seek aid of Mars and the Lares (lases), beseeching Mars not to let plagues or disasters overtake in the fields, asking him to be satiated, and dance, and call forth the "Semones", who may represent sacred sowers.  (Cf. Semo Sancus, a god of good faith.) Semones are minor tutelary deities, in particular Sancus, Priapus, Faunus, all Vertumni, all Silvani, Bona Dea. The semones are probably the hidden life forces residing in seeds: they were presented as only offering milk in the earliest tradition.

limen sali, sta means jump over the beam of the threshold/door/lintel, stand in standard Latin.

See also
Carmen (verse)
Carmen Saliare

External links 
Carmen Arvale (Bibliotheca Augustana)

Notes

References

Ancient Roman religion
Roman religion inscriptions
Old Latin literature
3rd-century inscriptions